Henrique Costa Mecking (born 23 January 1952), also known as Mequinho, is a Brazilian chess grandmaster who reached his zenith in the 1970s and is still one of the strongest players in Brazil. He was a chess prodigy, drawing comparisons to Bobby Fischer, although he did not achieve the International Grandmaster title until 1972. He won the Interzonals of Petropolis 1973 and Manila 1976. His highest FIDE rating is 2635, achieved in 1977, when he was ranked number four in the world. He became the 3rd best in the world in 1977, behind only World Champion Anatoly Karpov and Viktor Korchnoi.
He is the first Brazilian to become a grandmaster. Despite winning his first national championship at the age of 13, he played in very few tournaments. He won at Vršac in 1971 and finished third with Robert Byrne (after the co-winners Anatoly Karpov and Viktor Korchnoi) at Hastings in 1971–72. In 1975, he twice shared second place behind Ljubomir Ljubojević, firstly at Las Palmas with Ulf Andersson and Mikhail Tal and then at Manila with Lev Polugaevsky, Bent Larsen and Helmut Pfleger.

He was considered a contender for the World Championship in the mid-1970s, however his chess career was interrupted by a serious illness (Myasthenia gravis).

Mecking played for Brazil in the Chess Olympiads of 1968, 1974, 2002 and 2004.

World Championship candidate 
Mecking was a regular participant in FIDE events to choose a challenger for the World Chess Championship. After unsuccessful attempts to qualify from the Interzonals of Sousse 1967 and Palma de Mallorca 1970, he had his first major triumph in 1973, when he won at the Petrópolis Interzonal (ahead of a very strong field that included Paul Keres, David Bronstein et al.). He was subsequently eliminated from the Candidates Tournament in the quarterfinals, after losing his match against Korchnoi. Still, from this time until 1979, he was the strongest player born in the West after Bobby Fischer's effective retirement in 1972.

At his next attempt in 1976, Mecking won the Manila Interzonal (ahead of Vlastimil Hort, Lev Polugaevsky, Vitaly Tseshkovsky, Ljubomir Ljubojević, Zoltán Ribli et al.), thereby reaching a second successive Candidates matches stage, but again lost in the quarterfinals, this time to Polugaevsky. Illness (myasthenia gravis) forced his withdrawal from the Interzonal in Rio de Janeiro 1979 after a first round draw with Borislav Ivkov. His illness was so severe that it was widely believed he would soon die. He survived but did not play chess during the 1980s. While he was able to recover and to resume his chess career in 1991 with matches against Predrag Nikolić and (in 1992) Yasser Seirawan, followed by intermittent tournament appearances, his chance at the world title had passed and he has not reached the Candidates matches again.

Personal life 
Mecking is a convert to Catholicism, to which he credits the improvement of his medical condition. He is a member of the Catholic charismatic renewal.

Notable games 
 Mecking vs. Aivars Gipslis, Interzonal 1967; . A game from Mecking's first Interzonal, played when he was 15 years old.
 Mecking vs. Bobby Fischer, Buenos Aires 1970; Grünfeld Defence, .
 Mecking vs. Mikhail Tal, Las Palmas 1975;.

References 

Bibliography

External links 

Happy Birthday Mequinho!  Chessdom
Chess – "Boy Wonder" Challenges the Master – 1969, a contemporary video report by British Movietone on the 1969 Hastings International Chess Congress. Mecking, then fourteen years old, features.

1952 births
Living people
Chess grandmasters
Chess Olympiad competitors
Brazilian chess players
Brazilian people of German descent
People from Santa Cruz do Sul
Brazilian Roman Catholics
Converts to Roman Catholicism